Thomas Oliver Grace (born 24 October 1948) is an Irish former rugby player. He played for University College Dublin RFC and St. Mary's College RFC winger in the 1960 and 1970s as well as for his province Leinster. He appeared for the Ireland national rugby union team during his career. He is best remembered for scoring Ireland's only try in the 10-10 draw with the All Blacks in 1973 at Lansdowne Road.

He represented the British and Irish Lions on the 1974 tour to South Africa.
Grace played senior rugby for Newbridge College.

An accountant by profession he was one of Ireland's leading insolvency practitioners. He was Honorary Treasurer of the Irish Rugby Football Union for 13 years before retiring in 2020.

References

1948 births
Living people
Ireland international rugby union players
People educated at Newbridge College
St Mary's College RFC players
University College Dublin R.F.C. players
Leinster Rugby players
Irish rugby union players
British & Irish Lions rugby union players from Ireland
Rugby union wings